John Sedgewick (12 August 1873 – 13 August 1940) was a British sports shooter. He competed in two events at the 1912 Summer Olympics.

References

1873 births
1940 deaths
British male sport shooters
Olympic shooters of Great Britain
Shooters at the 1912 Summer Olympics
Sportspeople from Kendal
20th-century British people